John Hinton (1672-1743) was an Anglican priest in Ireland during the 18th century.

Clarke was born in Chipping Norton and educated at Trinity College, Dublin. He was Dean of Tuam from 1716 until his death.

References

Alumni of Trinity College Dublin
Deans of Tuam
18th-century Irish Anglican priests
1743 deaths
1672 births
People from Chipping Norton